Patricia D. Pettey (born November 28, 1946) is a Democratic member of the Kansas Senate, representing the 6th district since 2013.

References

External links 
State legislative page
Midwest Democracy
Ballotpedia

Living people
Democratic Party Kansas state senators
1946 births
21st-century American politicians
Women state legislators in Kansas
21st-century American women politicians
University of Kansas alumni
Emporia State University alumni
Democratic Party members of the Kansas House of Representatives
20th-century American women politicians
20th-century American politicians